Rosa Elena Baduy Isaac (born 20 March 1938) is a Mexican politician from the Institutional Revolutionary Party. She has  served as Deputy of the L and LVIII Legislatures representing Yucatán.

References

1938 births
Living people
Politicians from Yucatán (state)
Members of the Congress of Yucatán
Women members of the Chamber of Deputies (Mexico)
Institutional Revolutionary Party politicians
20th-century Mexican politicians
20th-century Mexican women politicians
21st-century Mexican politicians
21st-century Mexican women politicians
Deputies of the LVIII Legislature of Mexico
Members of the Chamber of Deputies (Mexico) for Yucatán